The Pothonggang Canal (Pot'onggang Canal, Potonggang Unha) is a river in North Korea. It flows through the capital Pyongyang and is a tributary of the Pothong River.

Prior to 1946, Pothonggang Canal was part of Pothong River. In 1946 "Pothong River Improvement Project" separated Pothonggang Canal.

Nowadays, Pothonggang Canal became park of Pyongyang as Potong River Pleasure Ground.

Notes and references

 

Rivers of North Korea
Geography of Pyongyang